This was the first edition of the tournament. 
Top seeds Konstantin Kravchuk and Denys Molchanov won the title by defeating Alexandr Igoshin and Yaraslav Shyla in the final, 6–3, 7–6(7–4).

Seeds

Draw

References
 Main Draw

Agri Challenger - Doubles
Doubles